Yordan Ivanov may refer to:

Yordan Ivanov (bobsleigh) (born 1966), Bulgarian Olympic bobsledder
Yordan Ivanov (equestrian) (born 1932), Bulgarian Olympic equestrian
Yordan Ivanov (literary historian) (1872–1947), Bulgarian scholar